James Lee Davis (born September 29, 1946) is a retired American college basketball coach.  He was most recently the women's head coach at Young Harris.

Head coaching record

References

1946 births
Living people
American women's basketball coaches
Basketball coaches from Tennessee
Clemson Tigers women's basketball coaches
Florida Gators women's basketball coaches
High school basketball coaches in Tennessee
Junior college women's basketball coaches in the United States
Middle Tennessee Blue Raiders women's basketball coaches
Minnesota Lynx coaches
Tennessee Tech Golden Eagles women's basketball coaches
Tennessee Wesleyan University alumni
Tennessee Technological University alumni
Young Harris Mountain Lions coaches